The 2020 Princess Auto Players' Championship was scheduled to be held from April 7 to 12, at the Mattamy Athletic Centre in Toronto, Ontario. On March 12, 2020, the event was cancelled due to the COVID-19 pandemic. The event was cancelled before the teams were announced.

References

External links

2020
Players' Championship
Players' Championship
Players' Championship
Curling in Toronto
Sports competitions in Toronto
2020 in Toronto
Curling events cancelled due to the COVID-19 pandemic